David Toop (born 5 May 1949) is an English musician, author, curator, and Emeritus Professor. From 2013 to 2021 he was professor of audio culture and improvisation at the London College of Communication. He was a regular contributor to British music magazine The Wire and the British magazine The Face. He was a member of the Flying Lizards.

Early years
Soon after his birth, his parents moved to Waltham Cross, Hertfordshire, where he grew up. He was educated at Broxbourne Grammar School, which he left in 1967 to study at Hornsey College of Art and Watford School of Art.

Career
Toop published his pioneering book on hip hop, Rap Attack, in 1984. Eleven years later, Ocean of Sound appeared, described as Toop's "poetic survey of contemporary musical life from Debussy through Ambient, Techno, and drum 'n' bass." Subsequent books include Exotica, a winner of the American Book Awards in 2000, Sinister Resonance (2010), and Into the Maelstrom, his survey of free improvisation shortlisted for the Penderyn Music Book prize in 2017. Since the early 1970s, Toop has also been a significant presence on the British experimental and improvised music scene, collaborating with Paul Burwell (playing guitar and flutes in their duo, Rain In the Face), Bob Cobbing with the group abAna, Hugh Davies, Max Eastley, Brian Eno, and others, more recently performing with Rie Nakajima, Thurston Moore, Ryuichi Sakamoto, Sidsel Endresen, Camille Norment, Akio Suzuki and Elaine Mitchener. In 1974 he edited and co-published the book, New/Rediscovered Musical Instruments, featuring the work of Max Eastley, Hugh Davies, Evan Parker, Paul Lytton, Paul Burwell and himself. He was a founder member of the London Musicians Collective, Musics magazine and Collusion magazine, and in 1977 founded his record label, Quartz Publications. He is a member of the improvising, genre-hopping quartet Alterations, active from 1977 to 1986 and reforming in 2015. In 2000, Toop curated the sound art exhibition Sonic Boom, and the following year, he curated a 2-CD collection entitled Not Necessarily English Music: A Collection of Experimental Music from Great Britain, 1960–1977. More experimentally, Toop has also actively engaged with 'sounding objects' from a range of museums. His opera Star-shaped Biscuit was performed as a Faster Than Sound Project at Aldeburgh in 2012.

Bibliography
 Rap Attack: African Jive to New York Hip Hop (1984)  – republished with additional chapters as
 Rap Attack 2: African Rap To Global Hip Hop (1992) 
 Rap Attack 3 (2000) 
 Ocean of Sound: Aether Talk, Ambient Sound and Imaginary Worlds (1995) 
 Exotica: Fabricated Soundscapes in a Real World (1999) 
 Haunted Weather: Music, Silence, and Memory (2004) 
 Sinister Resonance: The Mediumship of the Listener (2010) 
 Into the Maelstrom: Music, Improvisation and the Dream of Freedom, Before 1970(2016) 
 Flutter Echo (2017) in Japanese 
 Flutter Echo (2019) in English 
 Inflamed Invisible: Collected Writings on Art and Sound 1976-2018 (2019)

Partial discography

Solo and collaborations
 New and Rediscovered Musical Instruments (with Max Eastley) (1975)
 Wounds (with Paul Burwell) (1979)
 Whirled Music (with Max Eastley, Paul Burwell, Steve Beresford) (1980)
 Buried Dreams (with Max Eastley) (1994)
 Ancient Lights and the Blackcore (with Scorn, Seefeel, Timothy Leary/Dj Ched I Sabbah)
 Screen Ceremonies (1995)
 Pink Noir (1996)
 Spirit World (1997)
 Hot Pants Idol (1999)
 Museum of Fruit (1999)
 Needle in the Groove (with Jeff Noon) (2000)
 Black Chamber (2003)
 Breath-Taking (with Akio Suzuki) (2003)
 37th Floor at Sunset (2004)
 Doll Creature (with Max Eastley) (2004)
 Sound Body (2007)
 Wunderkammern (with Rhodri Davies, Lee Patterson) (2010)
 Lost Shadows: In Defence of the Soul - Yanomami Shamanism, Songs, Ritual, 1978 (2013)
 The Myriad Creatures will be Transformed of their own accord (2015)
 Entities Inertias Faint Beings (2016)
 Dirty Songs Play Dirty Songs (2017)
 Apparition Paintings (2020)
 Field Recordings and Fox Spirits (2020)
 On White, Indigo and Lamp Black (with Avsluta) (2020)
 Until the Night Melts Away (with John Butcher and Sharon Gal) (2021)
 Garden Of Shadows And Light (with Ryuichi Sakamoto) (2021)
 Breathing Spirit Forms (with Akio Suzuki and Lawrence English) (2021)

Curated albums
 Ocean of Sound (1996) – (2-CD set intended to accompany his book)
 Crooning on Venus (1996)
 Sugar & Poison: Tru-Life Soul Ballads for Sentients, Cynics, Sex Machines & Sybarites (1996)
 Booming on Pluto: Electro for Droids (1997)
 Guitars on Mars (1997)
 Not Necessarily "English Music" (2001)
 Haunted Weather : Music, Silence, and Memory (2004) – (2-CD set intended to accompany his book)

References

External links

Kinda Muzik interview (11/2000)
Perfect Sound Forever interview (08/1997)
David Toop's page on vibrofiles.com
Short film on Unknown Devices, the laptop orchestra
Headphone Commute interview (2020)
Tone Glow interview (10/2020)
David Toop blog site.

Free improvisation
English writers about music
English experimental musicians
1949 births
Virgin Records artists
Samadhi Sound artists
Living people
The Wire (magazine) writers
American Book Award winners
Incus Records artists
Sub Rosa Records artists